Jaime Filipe Monroy Zamith Piedade Pereira (born 19 March 1982) known as Jaime Monroy is a Portuguese football manager.

Career

In 2013, Monroy was appointed assistant manager of Azerbaijani side Baku. In 2016, he was appointed manager of Sydney Olympic in Australia. In 2021, he was appointed manager of Greek second division club Xanthi.

References

External links
 

Living people
1982 births
Portuguese football managers
Expatriate football managers in Greece
Expatriate football managers in Azerbaijan
Xanthi F.C. managers
Sydney Olympic FC managers